Ilse Gerda Wunsch (December 14, 1911 – October 8, 2003) was an American composer, pianist, teacher, and choral conductor who was born in Germany.

Wunsch was born in Berlin, where she began her studies in piano.  She immigrated to the United States and received her M.M. degree from the Chicago Music College. Wunsch studied piano with Rudolf Ganz, composition with Max Wald, and counterpoint with Erich Katz. She taught at the New York College of Music from 1948 to 1968 and at the Stern College for Women, Yeshiva University from 1960 to 1964. When the New York College of Music became New York University in 1968, Wunsch continued teaching as an associate professor of music education there. She was the organist and choir director at Temple Beth-El in Cedarhurst, New York, from 1949 to 1968. Wunsch married Otto Mainzer in 1966.

Publications 

Brainwriting in the Theory Class: The Importance of Perception in Taking Dictation (article in Music Educators Journal vol 60 no 1 September 1973)
Improvisation. . . How? (article in American Music Teacher vol 21 no 6 1972)

Compositions 

Sabbath Morning Service (text by Rabbi Edward T. Sandrow, for unison or two-part chorus and solo voice with organ or piano accompaniment; 1956)
Sacred Songs''
Twelve Progressing Tone Plays (for piano; 1972)
Young Faith (Sabbath evening service; text by Rabbi Edward T. Sandrow, for unison or two-part chorus and solo voice with organ or piano accompaniment; 1956)

References

1911 births
2003 deaths
20th-century American composers
20th-century American women musicians
American women pianists
Chicago Musical College alumni
Choral conductors
Composers from New York City
German emigrants to the United States
Musicians from Berlin
New York College of Music faculty
New York University faculty
Yeshiva University faculty
German women pianists